

Fritz Fullriede (4 January 1895 – 3 November 1969) was a German officer and war criminal during World War II. Fullriede fought in the German invasion of Poland, on the Eastern Front, in the Afrika Korps and the Italian Campaign. The last commander of Festung Kolberg, Fullriede received the Knight's Cross of the Iron Cross with Oak Leaves in 1945. After the war, Fullriede was tried and convicted by a Dutch court for his role in the Putten raid of 1944. He was sentenced to 2,5 years.

Awards
 Iron Cross (1914) 2nd Class (25 August 1917)
 Wound Badge (1918) in Black (20 July 1918)
 Hanseatic Cross of Bremen (25 July 1918)2nd Class (7 July 1941)
 Iron Cross (1939) 1st Class (23 October 1941)
 Wound Badge (1939) in Gold (20 August 1941)
 Knight's Cross of the Iron Cross with Oak Leaves
 Knight's Cross on 11 April 1943 as Oberstleutnant and commander of Kampfgruppe Fullriede in the Panzer AOK 5
 803rd Oak Leaves on 23 March 1945 as Oberst and commander of the fortress Kolberg

References

Citations

Bibliography

 
 

1895 births
1969 deaths
Major generals of the German Army (Wehrmacht)
German Army personnel of World War I
Military personnel from Bremen
Recipients of the Knight's Cross of the Iron Cross with Oak Leaves
German Army generals of World War II
Recipients of the Iron Cross (1914), 2nd class
Recipients of the Hanseatic Cross (Bremen)